A Aa is a 2016 Indian Telugu-language romantic comedy family film written and directed by Trivikram Srinivas and produced by S. Radha Krishna of Haarika & Hassine Creations. The film stars Nithiin, Samantha and Anupama Parameswaran. Mickey J Meyer composed the score and soundtrack.

The film is loosely based on the novel Meena written by Yaddanapudi Sulochana Rani, which has earlier been adapted into the 1973 film Meena by  Vijaya Nirmala, starring Krishna. The plot follows Anasuya Ramalingam, daughter of Mahalakshmi, a rich and strict businesswoman, who falls in love with her cousin, Anand, an ex-chef when she is sent to visit her aunt in a village. 

Launched officially in September 2015, the film's principal photography took place in October 2015 and ended in April 2016. The film was released on 2 June 2016, after multiple postponements. Samantha won several accolades including a Best Actress award at the 64th Filmfare Awards South and Best Performance in a Leading Role at the 2nd IIFA Utsavam Awards, for her portrayal as Anasuya Ramalingam. The film was successful at the box office, and stood as the eighth highest-grossing Telugu film of 2016.

Plot
A Aa revolves around the lives of 23-year-old Anasuya Ramalingam and Anand Vihari and their families. Anand, a former chef, runs an e-foods business in Hyderabad. He belongs to a middle-class family with responsibilities to fulfill, like getting his sister Bhanumathi married and paying off debts (his father is dead).

Anasuya is the daughter of a rich and strict mother named Mahalakshmi. Anasuya has never really got along with her mother, while being very close to her father, Ramalingam, who doesn't talk much against Mahalakshmi. When her mother goes on a business trip, her father Ramalingam sends her to visit her extended family in Kalavapudi village near Vijayawada to avoid a matchmaking for her. On the train ride there, she meets her cousin Aanand, whom her father asked to accompany her back to his home.

While she happily discovers the joy of being at her maternal uncle's house in Kalavapudi, she and Anand playfully butt heads through a series of comical situations. But she also discovers that Anand is being coerced into to marrying a girl in the village, Nagavalli, due to Aanand's family being in debt to Nagavalli's father, Pallam Venkanna, and Nagavalli loving Anand. Anand is not interested, but unable to turn down the proposal from Nagavalli's father, he keeps deferring it using his sister Bhanu's marriage as an excuse.

One day when Nagavalli comes to their house, she takes an instant disliking to Anasuya upon learning she is Anand's cousin. Anasuya decides to frustrate her further by acting close with Anand in front of her. An irked Nagavalli gets her father to call Anasuya's father and threatens to inform Mahalakshmi that Anasuya is currently in Kalavupudi. There is some backstory as to why Mahalakshmi doesn't like her brother's family - which is revealed later. Ramalingam resolves the situation, but Mahalakshmi's secretary eavesdropped on the phone call and decides to call her anyway. Ramalingam maintains his calm but quickly calls Anand and asks him to bring Anasuya back to the city before Mahalakshmi returns from Chennai. Aanand manages to convince Nagavalli to lend him a jeep, which she agrees to only because Anasuya is leaving the village, and gets her back home before her mother returns.

Back at home, Anasuya now realises her love for Anand. However, Mahalakshmi has already arranged her marriage with a rich guy named Shekhar, which got intentionally canceled by Ramalingam in Anasuya's favor without revealing their identity. She defers meeting him twice, but eventually is forced to meet at a golf course. There, she accidentally hits the ball straight in his face and also injures the caddie. When Anu takes Shekar to the hospital, she runs into Anand and Bhanu. He reveals that his mother has been hospitalized after Pallam Venkanna ridiculed their family status and Bhanu's lack of marriage prospects in an attempt to make it seem like he was doing them a favour by allowing Anand to marry his daughter. Although Anasuya is happy to see Anand and Bhanu, she is saddened by this news. To make matters worse, she sees that Nagavalli and her father are also at the hospital. She then asks Anand if Bhanu can stay with her at her family's place as they became close friends during her time in Kalavupudi. Anand agrees but gives permission for only for a day.

Anasuya brings her home and reveals to Mahalakshmi that Bhanu is Anand's sister. Mahalakshmi initially refuses to let Bhanu in but agrees later. She reveals that she had taken a loan from Anand's father(Mahalakshmi's brother), Krishnamoorthy, for business, and when she came to return the money, they had refused and closed the door on her face because Anand's father died. She warns Anasuya to be careful with Bhanu. Later that night Bhanu sees Shekhar's photo and says that he is good-looking. Anasuya again gets an idea, and next day, takes her to a mall and makes a deal with Bhanu. Bhanu had Anasuya help her ruin a proposal that came while she was staying with her, so now Anasuya says Bhanu owes her the same favour. As this plan unfolds, Shekar starts to fall in love with Bhanu. At one point, Shekar's grandfather mistakes Bhanu for Anasuya and even he agrees for their marriage.

In the meantime, Anasuya finally confesses her feelings to Anand. But he reveals that Mahalakshmi delaying and then refusing to return the money she borrowed from his father all those years ago, was the reason for his father's death. Krishnamoorthy's properties and wealth that he had put as collateral for Mahalakshmi's business came up for auction after 4 years (Mahalakshmi promised to give it back in 2 years) and when he asked Mahalakshmi to give back the money, she refused and cited that it's not the end of the world for him if their ancestral land got auctioned off. Unable to take the humiliation in the village, Krishnamoorthy committed suicide before the auction took place, warning Anand in his suicide note to not sacrifice his happiness for other people's happiness. Anand also says Anasuya's father wasn't there for them when he was needed to stand up against her mother for what she was doing. He is unsure how both families will ever agree to their marriage.

Mahalakshmi discovers that Shekhar loves Bhanu and not her daughter and locks her up. This angers Anasuya, who meets Anand and urges him to elope with her. He refuses, and this angers her more, and she starts walking aimlessly. She gets kidnapped by Pallam Venkanna's henchmen. Anand manages to save her, just in time for her engagement with Shekar and leaves with Bhanu. He reveals to Bhanu that he loves Anasuya, and she urges him to reveal the truth to Anasuya. He goes back to her engagement party and confesses his love, saying that he will keep her happy in any way she wants. Mahalakshmi demands Anand to let go of her daughter, but Anand confronts her for how she cheated his father out of the money she owed him. In the end, he leaves with Anasuya.

When Anasuya and Anand reach his house, she is surprised to see her parents there. Her father reveals that as soon as Anasuya and Anand left, Mahalakshmi had a panic attack, but he managed to calm her down and get through to her about why they should let them be together. In the end, both families make amends for their past mistakes. Shekar also visits soon after to ask for Bhanu's hand in marriage.

And lastly, Nagavalli seems to be coping with the fact that Anand isn't going to marry her...but she then says to her father that if the pair were to separate one day, Anand would return to her.

Cast 

 Nithiin as Anand "Nandu" Vihari 
 Samantha Ruth Prabhu as Anasuya "Anu" Ramalingam 
 Ananya as Bhanumathi "Bhanu" Krishnamoorthy, Anand's sister
 Anupama Parameswaran as Nagavalli "Valli" Venkanna's daughter, Anand's fiancée 
 Nadhiya as Mahalakshmi, Anu's mother
 Naresh as Ramalingam, Anu's father
 Rao Ramesh as Pallam Venkanna, Valli's father
 Srinivas Avasarala as Shekar, Anu's former fiancée, and Bhanu's love interest
 Easwari Rao as Kameshwari, Nandu's mother
 Jayaprakash as Krishnamoorthy, Nandu's father
 Hari Teja as Mangamma, Anu's househelp and personal assistant
 Srinivasa Reddy as Gopal, Mahalakshmi's secretary
 Ajay as Pallam Venkanna's son and Valli's brother
 Posani Krishna Murali as Pallam Narayana, Pallam Venkanna's brother
 Giri Babu as Banerjee, Shekar's grandfather
 Shanoor Sana as Latha, Mahalakshmi's friend
 Raghu Babu as Raghu, Latha's boyfriend
 Praveen as Muthyam, Nandu's friend and labour
 Shakalaka Shankar as Pratap, thief who wanted to steal in Nandu's house
 Sri Sudha Bheemireddy as Anu's acting teacher
 Annapoorna as Baby Mamma, an old woman in Nandu's village
 Rajitha as Baby Mamma's relative
 Karate Kalyani as Baby Mamma's relative
 Heroshini Komali as Nandu's youngest sister
 Chammak Chandra as Bhanu's former fiancée 
 Gundu Hanumantha Rao as Bhanu's former prospective father-in-law, (Chammak Chandra)'s father 
 Sivannarayana Naripeddi as a doctor

Production

Development
In August 2015, it was announced that Trivikram Srinivas will be directing a movie with Nithiin and Samantha, and S. Radha Krishna will produce the film under his banner Haarika & Haasine Creations. It was also announced that Anirudh Ravichander will compose music for the film, marking his Tollywood debut. On 10 September 2015, the makers announced the title of the film as A Aa, with the tagline Anasuya Ramalingam vs Anand Vihari, resembling the names of the two lead characters in the film. The film was launched on 24 September 2015, at Ramanaidu Studios in Nanakramguda, Hyderabad.

Casting
Samantha Ruth Prabhu makes her third collaboration with Trivikram Srinivas after Attarintiki Daredi (2013) and S/O Satyamurthy (2015). During mid September Anupama Parameswaran was confirmed to be a part of the film playing the second heroine. During Mid September, it was reported that Nadhiya will be playing a key role in this film. During Early October 2015, it was reported that Srinivas Avasarala was a part the film playing a key role. In early November it was reported that Ananya was selected to play the role of Nithiin's sister Bhanumathi. It was also reported that she had initially turned down the offer, but later accepted it after she realized the scope of her character. During Mid-January it was reported that Naresh will be a part of this film. It was also reported that he will be playing husband of Nadhiya.

Crew
Anirudh Ravichander was originally selected to compose the music for this film. However, he was later replaced by Mickey J Meyer, as he opted out of the project, due to his busy schedules with Tamil films. The cinematography was initially handled by Natarajan Subramaniam and was later taken over by Dudley, after the former left the project midway. Kotagiri Venkateswara Rao was confirmed as the film's editor, and Rajeevan was signed in to handle the production design, although he was replaced by A. S. Prakash as the art director during late November 2015.

Filming
The regular shooting of this film was expected to start on 10 October 2015, although the shooting of the film being delayed to 16 October. Samantha started shooting for this film on 21 October 2015, whereas on the same day, Nithiin filmed the fight sequences of the film, at the Ramoji Film City in Hyderabad, which were filmed under the supervision of stunt choreographer Ravi Varma. In November 2015, it was reported that Samantha would be dubbing for her role for the first time in Telugu, which was later refuted by Samantha herself on early 2016.

As of early February 2016, 80 percent of the shooting is completed and also the major part of the talkie portions have been shot. The team headed to Pollachi on 15 February, and the unit canned a romantic duet and some important scenes featuring Nithiin and Samantha for 10 days. Filming of final schedule commenced on 26 February in Hyderabad. The principal photography of the film was wrapped up on 23 April 2016.

Soundtrack

The film's soundtrack and background music is composed by Mickey J. Meyer, collaborating with Trivikram Srinivas for the first time. The album features five tracks, with lyrics written by Ramajogayya Sastry and Krishna Chaitanya. The audio rights of the film were acquired by Aditya Music. The film's soundtrack album was originally slated to launch on 15 April 2016. However, the audio release was postponed to late April. Eventually, the album was released on 1 May 2016, at a launch event in Shilpakala Vedika at Hyderabad, with actor Pawan Kalyan attending as chief guest. The album released in a jukebox format through YouTube, before the launch and got more than 1 million views on the video-sharing platform.

The audio received positive reviews from critics. Behindwoods gave 2.75 out of 5 stating that the album is a "whiff of fresh air from Mickey J Meyer in the midst of heavy duty albums". Sravana Bhargavi of The Times of India gave 4 out of 5 and stated "The album is a winner in terms of the variety that Mickey brings to the table." Indiaglitz gave 3.25 out of 5 stating that "The album comes with good situational songs." Karthik Srinivasan of Milliblog reviewed it as "a simple and modest soundtrack from Mickey J Meyer". Moviecrow gave 3 out of 5 stating it as an "ear-pleasing album far from regular commercial potboilers".

Release
Producer S. Radha Krishna had initially planned to release the film on 14 January 2016, coinciding with Sankranthi, but later the release date was moved to 14 February 2016 to release it on Valentine's Day. During early February, the makers postponed the release of the film to 22 April 2016. The release was further postponed to 6 May 2016, and later to 20 May, due to the release of Suriya's 24 (2016). But the film was postponed to 3 June, due to Mahesh Babu's Brahmotsavam (2016) as a majority of the theaters were occupied for the film. On 26 May 2016, the makers announced that the release of the film was preponed to 2 June.

BlueSky Cinemas, one of the leading players in overseas market for Indian movies bought the rights of this film during early November 2015. They bought the rights of this film before the filming began. During the end of December 2015, Eurotolly bought rights from BlueSky Cinemas to distribute this movie in Europe (excluding UK).

Reception

Critical reception 
Sangeetha Devi Dundoo of The Hindu wrote "Simple tale, effectively told. Trivikram Srinivas narrates an enjoyable tale of romance and relationships".
The Times of India gave 3 out of 5 stars stating "Trivikram really gives this modern take an edge of its own and sets it apart from both the book and the earlier film, Meena (1973). Mickey J Meyer's music which is refreshing and the camerawork of Natarajan and Dudley who give the film a visual splendour".
The New Indian Express gave 3 out of 5 stars stating "Trivikram Srinivas masterfully elevates a simple story into a romantic comedy. A..Aa undoubtedly is Samantha's film, she delivers a stellar performance and shows what she can do if given ample screen time. Nithiin delivers his finest performance too".
Daily News and Analysis gave 3 out of 5 stars stating "A...Aa a film that adds humour to a regular boy-girl romance which should be seen to be experienced. Samantha and Nithiin's performances in this movie will be what people will rave about for days to come".
Jeevi of Idlebrain.com gave 3.25 out of 5 stars stating "Plus points of the film are Trivikram dialogues, Samantha and emotional scenes. On the flipside, the flashback of the film which is the foundation looks little hazy and the pace in second half should have been faster".

Box office 
A Aa collected 38.15 crore gross and 26.68 crore share worldwide in the first weekend.
in the second week movie collected a total of 67.4 crore gross and 44.38 crore share worldwide in two weeks.
In its lifetime movie collected a total gross of 75.4 crore and share of 47.48 crore worldwide.

A Aa collected $1.5 Million in its first weekend, and collected over $2 Million in its full run at United States boxoffice, which is third highest grossing Telugu film in the US at that time.

Awards and nominations

Notes

References

External links 

 

2016 films
2016 romantic comedy-drama films
Indian romantic comedy-drama films
Films shot in Telangana
Films directed by Trivikram Srinivas
Films scored by Mickey J Meyer
Films based on novels by Yaddanapudi Sulochana Rani
Films shot in Pollachi
Indian family films
2016 drama films
Tamil film producers
2010s Telugu-language films
Films shot in Andhra Pradesh
Films set in Andhra Pradesh